Noh Sa-yeon (born March 3, 1957) is a South Korean singer, television personality, and radio DJ.

Discography

Studio albums

Awards

References

1957 births
Living people
South Korean women pop singers
South Korean musical theatre actresses
South Korean television personalities
South Korean radio presenters
Dankook University alumni
South Korean women radio presenters